The UTSA Roadrunners men's basketball team represents the University of Texas at San Antonio in San Antonio, Texas, US. Originally competing as an NCAA independent in 1981–82, the Roadrunners moved to the Trans-America Athletic Conference in 1986–87, then moved to the Southland Conference in 1991–92, then moved to the Western Athletic Conference in 2012–2013, then moved to Conference USA in 2013–2014 where they are currently a member.  UTSA plays its home games at the on-campus Convocation Center, and is coached by former NBA player Steve Henson.

UTSA has won four conference tournaments and three conference regular season championships.  The team has made a total of four NCAA Men's Division I Basketball Championship appearances in its history. In the 2011 NCAA Men's Division I Basketball Championship, the Roadrunners defeated SWAC Champion Alabama State, 70–61 in the opening round before falling in the second round to Ohio State.  The victory over Alabama State marked the first time in school history that a Roadrunner team won an NCAA tournament game in any sport.  As a relatively young Division I program, the team has made no other appearances in post-season tournaments.

Don Eddy (1981-1986)
On May 14, 1980, Don Eddy was announced as the first head coach for UTSA, with the school planning to a field team starting in the 1980–81 season. After compiling a record of 56–54, he resigned following an altercation with a player in a January 26, 1986 game.
After his resignation, former Baylor basketball player Larry Gatewood closed out the season as interim head coach.

Ken Burmeister (1986-1990)
The Roadrunners moved to the Trans-America Athletic Conference for the 1986–87 season.  Ken Burmeister coached the roadrunners from 1986 to 1990 and led the team to its first appearance in the NCAA Tournament in 1988, where they lost to Illinois in the first round .

Stu Starner (1990-1995)
Stu Starner spent five seasons coaching the Roadrunners, Starner resigned in 1995 with an 84–58 record at the school. His teams won conference regular season championships in 1991 and 1992.

Tim Carter (1995-2006)
Tim Carter was hired as the head coach for the roadrunners, where he is the all-time winningest coach in the university's history.

Brooks Thompson (2006-2016)
On April 19, 2006, Thompson was named head coach of the roadrunners. On November 15, 2009, UTSA defeated the University of Iowa, UTSA's first ever win versus a Big Ten Conference school. On March 16, 2011, Thompson guided UTSA to the school's first ever NCAA Tournament win when the Roadrunners defeated  Alabama State 70–61. On March 10, 2016, he was fired by UTSA following a 5–27 record.

Steve Henson (2016-present)

In his first year of coaching, Henson engaged in a major rebuilding effort after succeeding Thompson as head coach. In his first year, UTSA posted a nine-win improvement in the overall record, going to 14–19 and a five-win improvement in Conference USA conference games to 8–10. In his second season, Henson posted a winning record for the first time since 2011–12, going 20–15 for the season and 11–7 in conference play, and being named the conference coach of the year. The UTSA Roadrunners lost in the quarterfinals of the 2018 C-USA tournament, but secured an invite into the 2018 CIT tournament. Henson has turned UTSA's home arena into a tough place to play amassing a 61–20 home record over his tenure.

Seasonal Record

  Don Eddy went 4–14 and Larry Gatewood went 3-10 as head coaches, respectively.

Postseason history

NCAA tournament results

The Roadrunners have appeared in four NCAA Tournaments. Their combined record is 1–4.

CIT results
The Roadrunners have appeared in the CollegeInsider.com Postseason Tournament (CIT) one time. Their record is 1–1.

Notable players

Retired jerseys
UTSA has retired two jerseys in program history. Also even though the jerseys are retired, the numbers are still available so current and future players can use them.

References

External links
 

 
Basketball teams established in 1981